The Hibernian Catch Club is a dining and catch musical club founded c.1680 in Dublin, Ireland by the vicars-choral of Christ Church and St. Patrick's Cathedrals.  It has been referred to as the oldest surviving musical society in Europe.

Membership was historically exclusive, restricted until 1770 to members of the vicars-choral. When participation was expanded in the late eighteenth century members still had to be appointed by committee, and included many prominent members of the Irish nobility, gentry, and professions.

References

Culture in Dublin (city)